Isaac William Taussig (July 30, 1850 – February 9, 1917) was the 22nd Mayor of Jersey City, New Jersey serving from May 3, 1880 to May 4, 1884.

Biography
The son of German Jewish immigrants, Taussig was born on July 30, 1850 in Manhattan, New York City. He had as siblings: Samuel Taussig, and Noah W. Taussig. Taussig became a sugar refiner with American Molasses Company and a candy merchant. A Democrat, he was nominated in a very controversial selection, when the Jersey City Democrats voted not to re-nominate incumbent Henry J. Hopper. Taussig won by a closer than expected majority. He would go on to serve two terms as mayor.

In August 1883, during his second term as mayor, Taussig's rock candy company, Taussig & Hammerschlag, went out of business. In September, Taussig and his partner Moritz Hammerschlag were arrested and charged with fraud. The Havemeyer Sugar Refining Company brought a lawsuit against them claiming they were induced to making a loan based on false financial statements made to Bradstreet's Mercantile Agency by Taussig in April 1883. Taussig and Hammerschlag lost the suit in December 1884.

Taussig married Cecilia Frank in San Francisco on December 14, 1887. He died in New York City on February 9, 1917. His widow died on May 8, 1933.

References

1850 births
1917 deaths
American people of German-Jewish descent
Politicians from New York City
New Jersey Democrats
Mayors of Jersey City, New Jersey
Jewish mayors of places in the United States
Jewish American people in New Jersey politics